The Alfa Romeo V6 engine (also called the Busso V6) is a 60°  V6 engine made by Alfa Romeo from 1979 to 2005. The original design had short pushrods for the exhaust valves in a design similar to earlier Lancia Fulvia engines. The first DOHC version was in the 1993 Alfa Romeo 164, with an aluminium alloy engine block and head with sodium filled exhaust valves.

The Alfa Romeo V6 has been used in kit cars like the Ultima GTR, Hawk HF Series, and DAX, as well as the Gillet Vertigo sports car  and the Lancia Aurelia B20GT Outlaw.  In August 2011 EVO magazine wrote that "the original Alfa Romeo V6 was the most glorious-sounding six-cylinder road engine ever,"  The Alfa Romeo V6 engine has also been used in ice resurfacer made by engo Ltd. in Italy.

Thanks to the wonderful sound of this engine, the Busso V6 is also called the "Violin of Arese" or "Alfa's Violin".

12V, two valve

2.0
A  version was introduced in 1983. Both carburetted  and fuel-injected  versions were available from the start.

Applications:
 1983–1986 Alfa Romeo Alfa 6 2.0 V6
 1984–1987 Alfa Romeo 90 2.0 V6

2.0 Turbo

Applications:
 1991–1992 Alfa Romeo 164 V6 Turbo
 1992–1997 Alfa Romeo 164 Super V6 TB
 1994–2000 Alfa Romeo GTV 2.0 V6 TB
 1998–2000 Alfa Romeo Spider 2.0 V6 TB
 1996–2000 Alfa Romeo 166 Super V6 TB

2.5

The original engine displaced  and produced . It was a 2-valve-per-cylinder design with a single belt-driven camshaft per cylinder bank and six carburettors.

The Bosch L-Jetronic fuel injection was added for the 1983 Alfa 6, which produced the same . The 2-valve engine ended its life in the Alfa 155, where there were two series for this engine, the  developing . Differences between them were small and only on torque and power delivery producing exactly the same horsepower.

Applications:
 1979–1986 Alfa Romeo Alfa 6
 1980–1986 Alfa Romeo GTV6 (Alfa Romeo Alfetta GTV6 2.5)
 1984–1987 Alfa Romeo 90
 1985–1991 Alfa Romeo 75/Milano
 1992–1997 Alfa Romeo 155
 1985–1996 Fiat Croma
 1987–1989 Rayton Fissore Magnum V6
1982 AC 3000ME MkII Prototype

2.8 Gleich
In 1982, the German Alfa Romeo dealer and tuner Gleich offered a 2.8 conversion of the GTV6 2.5 engine. Dieter Gleich was sure that engine displacement enlargement is still the best and, for the life of the engine, the healthiest way of tuning. The engine capacity was increased to nearly 2.8 liters by using new bushings and custom-built forged Mahle pistons while the compression ratio was raised from 9.5 to 10.5:1.

The magazine "Sport driver" tested a 2.8 Gleich powered GTV6 in June 1982: 
"After engaging the first gear and a somewhat careless step on the gas pedal you get a touched feel to the epiphany GTV6 shot, accompanied by the typical Alfa Romeo exhaust sound. It was a pleasure. The really vehement propulsion waned only when the speedometer  mark has left behind. Another eye-opening experience awaits when you realize that the lightning speed to 7000 rpm rotating in any gear pinion even in fifth gear still from 1500 rpm is completely smooth."

Applications:
 1982 Alfa Romeo Alfetta GTV6 2.8 Gleich

3.0 SA (Autodelta)
The original 2.5 engine as used in the Alfa 6 was bored and stroked by Autodelta, the former Alfa Romeo racing department to match the racing rules for South African and Australian championships. It was, too, a 2-valve-per-cylinder design with a single belt-driven camshaft per cylinder bank and six carburettors.

Only 174 complete GTV6 3.0 SA cars were produced in 1984 plus 68 more in 1985. the last ones were fitted with EFI.

The 3.0 GTV6 was sold in South Africa in 1983-1985, predating the release of the 3.0 L displacement to the rest of the world.

Applications:
 1984–1985 Alfa Romeo Alfetta GTV6 3.0 SA

3.0
Pulled by the racing success of the 3.0 SA engine and looking for more power to boost 75/Milano sales in countries like USA, Alfa Romeo introduced a production version of the 3.0 engine. As the previous engines, it was a 2-valve-per-cylinder design with a single belt-driven camshaft per cylinder bank. The main difference with the racing 3.0 SA was the use of modern L-Jetronic fuel injection system by Bosch.

This engine was modified for transverse placement in the 164 and fitted with a high-performance camshaft and low-restriction exhaust, producing  in standard form,  when a catalyzer was added in 1991, with the Cloverleaf version producing .

The same engine was fitted to the SZ and RZ - ES30 Zagato, but even more finely tuned with wilder cams and high compression pistons to a further .

Applications:
 1987–1991 Alfa Romeo 75/Milano
 1988–1997 Alfa Romeo 164
 1989–1991 Alfa Romeo SZ
 1992–1994 Alfa Romeo RZ
 1992–1994 Lancia Thema
 1993–2000 Alfa Romeo Spider

24V, four valve

2.5 24V

A four-valve version was introduced in 1997 with the Alfa Romeo 156. The engine now produced . The 166 used a slightly detuned version to make more low rev torque. This engine version was awarded as the International Engine of the Year in 2000.

Applications:
 1996–2005 Alfa Romeo 156
 1996–2007 Alfa Romeo 166

3.0 24V

The engine was upgraded to dual overhead cams and four valves per cylinder in 1993. The final run of 3.0 V6 engines in the GTV, Spider and 166 range, produced  in the Euro 3-compliant version.

Applications:
 1991 Alfa Romeo Proteo concept car
 1993–1997 Alfa Romeo 164
 1994–2000 Lancia Kappa
 1996–2003 Alfa Romeo GTV
 2000–2003 Alfa Romeo Spider
 1996–2007 Alfa Romeo 166
 2001–2008 Lancia Thesis
 1998–present Gillet Vertigo (Vertigo also used a 3.6 L and 3.9 L version)

3.2 24V

Later this engine was also used in the Alfa Romeo 166, GTV, Spider and Alfa Romeo GT in a slightly detuned form . The engine has a bore and stroke . In Lancia this engine produced .

Applications:
 2002–2005 Alfa Romeo 156 GTA
 2002–2005 Alfa Romeo 147 GTA
 2002–2004 Alfa Romeo GTV
 2002–2004 Alfa Romeo Spider
 2003–2007 Alfa Romeo 166
 2003–2010 Alfa Romeo GT
 2003–2009 Lancia Thesis

3.5 24V
In December 2002, at the Bologna Motor Show, Alfa Romeo displayed a 156 GTAm prototype, built by N-Technology, with 3458cc. The power was increased to 300 PS at 6,800rpm. The engine had a bore and stroke of 97 mm x 78 mm. This version never came to production, and it was based on N-Technology's experience racing the 156 GTA SuperTuring.    

Application:     

 2002 Alfa Romeo 156 GTAm N.Technology

2.5 V6 DTM  

Alfa Romeo raced, in early 1990s, a 2.5-litre engine based on Busso's 60º V6. The engine was substantially revised and had a difference bore and stroke from the 2.5 standard engine, respectively, 93 mm x 61.3 mm, and making 420 bhp (313 kW) @ 11,800 rpm with a torque of 294 Nm. Alfa Romeo, during the 1993-1996 era of DTM/ITC, racked up an incredible thirty-eight victories of a total of eighty-nine starts. The V6-engined machine also qualified on pole nineteen times and set the fastest lap in forty-two races.     

Application:   

 Alfa Romeo 155 V6 TI DTM.   

Later, Alfa Romeo also raced a lighter 90º V6 engine, with 490 PS @11,900 rpm, in the DTM Championship.

Engine applications - Table

Production end 
The V6 production ended in 2005 at Alfa Romeo Arese Plant; a stock of five thousand were built, to be used in Lancia Thesis, Alfa 166 and Alfa GT models. The engine was replaced in the 159 and Brera by a new 3.2 L V6 unit combining a General Motors-designed engine block with Alfa Romeo cylinder heads and induction. British automotive engineering company Cosworth was keen to buy assembly lines of the Alfa Romeo V6 engine, but the Italian company did not want to sell it. The last version of 3.2 L engine was Euro4 compliant, so it would have been possible to produce it a couple of years more. The engine's designer Giuseppe Busso died within a couple of days after the last engine was produced in Arese.

Since 2015, Fiat Powertrain manufactures the all-new, Ferrari-derived 90° V6 Biturbo engine (Ferrari F154 engine) for the Giulia Quadrifoglio, Stelvio Quadrifoglio and Giulia GTA/GTA-m models.

See also
 Alfa Romeo Twin Cam engine
 Alfa Romeo Twin Spark engine

Notes

Further reading
 The Alfa Romeo V6 Engine High-Performance Manual, Jim Kartalamakis, Veloce Publishing, .

V6
Gasoline engines by model
V6 engines